Corwin is an unincorporated community in Blaine Township, Harper County, Kansas, United States.

History
Corwin was a station and shipping point on the Missouri Pacific Railroad.

A post office was opened in Corwin in 1883, and remained in operation until it was discontinued in 1957.

Education
The community is served by South Barber USD 255 public school district.

References

Further reading

External links
 Harper County maps: Current, Historic, KDOT

Unincorporated communities in Harper County, Kansas
Unincorporated communities in Kansas